The Madras Courier was the first newspaper to be published in Madras, Madras Presidency, British India and one of the first in India. It was the leading newspaper of its time and was the officially recognized newspaper for printing government notifications.

History
It first appeared in the English language on 12 October 1785. It was started by Richard Johnston. Hugh Boyd was its first editor.

On 12 October 2016, the Madras Courier was revived as a digital publication. It won the Best Digital News Start-up Award at the South Asian Digital Media Awards 2018.

References

Newspapers established in 1785
Publications with year of disestablishment missing
Defunct weekly newspapers
Defunct newspapers published in India
History of Chennai
English-language newspapers published in India
1785 establishments in India
Madras Presidency